Sheri Lynette Sam (born May 5, 1974) is an American professional women's basketball coach and player who played in the WNBA. She was born and raised in Lafayette, Louisiana as the youngest of eight siblings, and where she was a standout at Acadiana High School. She graduated from Vanderbilt University in 1996. She was an assistant coach at Eastern Illinois University.

Vanderbilt statistics
Source:

USA Basketball
She competed with USA Basketball as a member of the 1995 Jones Cup Team that won the Bronze in Taipei.

Sam was also invited to be a member of the Jones Cup team representing the US in 1996. She helped the team to a 9–0 record, and the gold medal in the event. Sam averaged 13 points per games, the highest scoring average on the team, and was named to the All-Tournament first team.

Professional

ABL
After her college graduation, Sam played three years for the San Jose Lasers in the now-defunct American Basketball League (ABL), a professional women's league.

WNBA
Shortly after the ABL ceased operations in 1999, Sam was selected by the Orlando Miracle in the WNBA Draft and became one of the Miracle's most productive players that year. Sam was waived by the Miracle just before the 2000 season began, but was signed as a free agent by the Miami Sol.  She played three seasons (2000, 2001, and 2002) with the Sol until the team folded due to financial difficulties. After the Sol ceased operations, the 2003 Dispersal Draft was held, and the Minnesota Lynx selected Sam, and she played for the Lynx that season.

During the annual WNBA Draft on April 15, 2004, Sam and Lynx teammate Janell Burse were traded to the Seattle Storm in exchange for Amanda Lassiter and a first-round draft pick.  The trade was engineered as part of the Lynx' plan to draft the highly touted (and local favorite) Lindsay Whalen. Unfortunately for the Lynx, the Connecticut Sun had already selected Whalen. Sam spent the 2004 season with the Seattle Storm, as the team won the WNBA Finals by defeating, ironically, the Connecticut Sun, two games to one. After the 2004 season ended, Sam became an unrestricted free agent. On February 14, 2005, Sam signed with the Charlotte Sting. She would be involved in yet another dispersal draft in 2007 after the demise of the Sting. This time, she was selected by the Indiana Fever. On May 7, 2008 Sheri signed with the Detroit Shock. Her 2008 season with the Detroit Shock was the last of her 10-year WNBA career.

During the 2007-08 WNBA off-season, she played for Ashdod in Israel. She played for Panionios in Greece during the 2008-09 WNBA off-season.

WNBA career statistics

Regular season

|-
| align="left" | 1999
| align="left" | Orlando
| 32 || 32 || 34.0 || .388 || .328 || .688 || 4.6 || 2.4 || 1.3 || 0.3 || 2.0 || 11.4
|-
| align="left" | 2000
| align="left" | Miami
| 31 || 27 || 29.2 || .387 || .292 || .670 || 4.3 || 2.1 || 1.1 || 0.2 || 2.4 || 12.8
|-
| align="left" | 2001
| align="left" | Miami
| 32 || 32 || 34.4 || .432 || .276 || .750 || 4.3 || 2.8 || 1.7 || 0.3 || 2.7 || 13.9
|-
| align="left" | 2002
| align="left" | Miami
| 32 || 32 || 33.5 || .434 || .342 || .618 || 4.8 || 2.6 || 2.2 || 0.2 || 2.2 || 14.5
|-
| align="left" | 2003
| align="left" | Minnesota
| 34 || 28 || 28.0 || .383 || .329 || .705 || 4.2 || 2.6 || 1.1 || 0.2 || 1.4 || 11.0
|-
|style="text-align:left;background:#afe6ba;"| 2004†
| align="left" | Seattle
| 34 || 32 || 29.9 || .412 || .262 || .855 || 4.1 || 2.4 || 1.6 || 0.2 || 1.9 || 9.1
|-
| align="left" | 2005
| align="left" | Charlotte
| 34 || 33 || 31.6 || .387 || .321 || .713 || 4.3 || 2.7 || 1.3 || 0.1 || 2.9 || 11.4
|-
| align="left" | 2006
| align="left" | Charlotte
| 34 || 34 || 29.1 || .399 || .269 || .627 || 5.1 || 2.6 || 1.6 || 0.1 || 2.1 || 10.6
|-
| align="left" | 2007
| align="left" | Indiana
| 33 || 4 || 17.9 || .339 || .273 || .690 || 2.9 || 1.3 || 0.9 || 0.2 || 1.2 || 5.0
|-
|style="text-align:left;background:#afe6ba;"| 2008†
| align="left" | Detroit
| 32 || 15 || 14.9 || .309 || .286 || .692 || 2.8 || 1.2 || 0.6 || 0.1 || 1.0 || 2.9
|-
| align="left" | Career
| align="left" | 10 years, 7 teams
| 328 || 269 || 28.3 || .397 || .302 || .698 || 4.1 || 2.3 || 1.3 || 0.2 || 2.0 || 10.2

Playoffs

|-
| align="left" | 2001
| align="left" | Miami
| 3 || 3 || 36.3 || .323 || .222 || .818 || 3.3 || 1.3 || 1.7 || 0.0 || 2.7 || 10.3
|-
| align="left" | 2003
| align="left" | Minnesota
| 3 || 0 || 24.7 || .357 || .000 || .750 || 5.3 || 2.7 || 2.0 || 0.0 || 2.7 || 8.7
|-
|style="text-align:left;background:#afe6ba;"| 2004†
| align="left" | Seattle
| 8 || 8 || 31.0 || .329 || .250 || .667 || 5.5 || 3.5 || 1.3 || 0.0 || 3.1 || 7.4
|-
| align="left" | 2007
| align="left" | Indiana
| 6 || 5 || 30.8 || .373 || .500 || .500 || 5.3 || 2.2 || 1.0 || 0.2 || 0.8 || 8.0
|-
|style="text-align:left;background:#afe6ba;"| 2008†
| align="left" | Detroit
| 6 || 0 || 5.0 || .286 || .000 || 1.000 || 0.5 || 0.0 || 0.2 || 0.0 || 0.0 || 1.0
|-
| align="left" | Career
| align="left" | 5 years, 5 teams
| 26 || 16 || 24.8 || .342 || .273 || .690 || 4.0 || 2.0 || 1.1 || 0.0 || 1.8 || 6.5

Later life
Sam served as the Assistant Coach of Women’s Basketball for Eastern Illinois University from 2013-2017.  From 2017 to 2019 she was Director of Athletics, Advancement Officer, for Mercy High School in San Francisco, and from 2019 to 2020 Director of Athletics for Athletic Advancement at the Bay School of San Francisco.

In September 2020 Sam was named the Managing Director of the Northern California PGA Foundation.

References

External links
Eastern Illinois Panthers coaching bio
 WNBA.com: Sheri Sam Bio

1974 births
Living people
All-American college women's basketball players
American expatriate basketball people in Greece
American expatriate basketball people in Israel
American women's basketball players
Basketball players from Louisiana
Charlotte Sting players
Detroit Shock players
Eastern Illinois Panthers women's basketball coaches
Indiana Fever players
Miami Sol players
Minnesota Lynx players
Orlando Miracle players
San Jose Lasers players
Seattle Storm players
Small forwards
Sportspeople from Lafayette, Louisiana
Vanderbilt Commodores women's basketball players
Women's National Basketball Association All-Stars